The Lavic Lake volcanic field is a volcanic field with extinct cinder cones in the Mojave Desert, in San Bernardino County, California, United States, at  elevation. Its cones lie directly alongside historic Route 66 and modern Interstate 40, between Barstow to the west and Ludlow  to the east.

Description

The  Lavic Lake volcanic field is a basaltic pahoehoe lava plain and has four Holocene (approximately 10,000 years ago) cinder cone type volcanos, three in the Lavic Dry Lake area, and a fourth located southwest in the Rodman Mountains.  The oldest cinder cone, Pisgah Crater may be pre-Holocene, erupting around 25,000 years ago.

The cone of Pisgah Crater has been modified by mining operations that provide a source of road aggregate.

The biome is the deserts and xeric shrublands, with smaller plants growing in soil pockets formed by erosion, sedimentation and wind deposits.

See also
Amboy Crater
Pisgah Crater
Cima volcanic field
Mojave National Preserve
Providence Mountains State Recreation Area
Mitchell Caverns
Coso Volcanic Field

References

External links

Natural history of the Mojave Desert
Volcanic fields of California
Mountain ranges of the Mojave Desert
Volcanoes of San Bernardino County, California
Landforms of San Bernardino County, California
Cinder cones of the United States
Mojave Desert
Volcanoes of California